The SRT was a class of London bus introduced in 1949. It was a rebuild of the pre-war STL type, an AEC Regent I with 7.7-litre engine, fitted with an RT-type body. These were underpowered due to the additional weight of the RT body, and they were confined to central London routes, e.g. 24. As new RT chassis became available, the bodies were transferred and the STL chassis scrapped.

External links
Ian's Bus Stop - The LONDON TRANSPORT SRTs

Vehicles introduced in 1949
Buses of the United Kingdom
Bus transport in London